Saint-Cyr Lake  is a freshwater body of water crossed by the Saint-Cyr River South in the north-eastern part of Senneterre, in La Vallée-de-l'Or Regional County Municipality (RCM), in the administrative region of Abitibi-Témiscamingue, in the province of Quebec, in Canada.

This body of water extends in the townships of Mesplet and Cherrier. Forestry is the main economic activity of the sector. Recreational tourism activities come second.

The hydrographic slope of Lake Saint-Cyr is accessible through a forest road (North-South direction) on the east side of the Saint-Cyr River Valley; in addition, another forest road (East-West direction) serves the northern part of the Saint-Cyr Lake Biodiversity Reserve and connects R1015 to the west.

The surface of Lac Saint-Cyr is usually frozen from early November to mid-May, however, safe ice circulation is generally from mid-November to mid-April.

Geography

Toponymy
The former name of this body of water was "Maskotirikan Lake". The term "Saint-Cyr" is a family name of French origin.

Its meaning is associated with that of the Saint-Cyr River (Opawica River) whose upper part was named distinctly Saint-Cyr River South on September 24, 2003 by the Commission de toponymie du Quebec. This commission took into account that the course of the Saint-Cyr river belonged from now on to two hydrographic slopes as a result of the construction of an impoundment dam.

The toponym "lac Saint-Cyr" was made official on December 5, 1968 by the Commission de toponymie du Québec, when it was created.

Notes and references

See also 

Lakes of Abitibi-Témiscamingue
Nottaway River drainage basin